William Clem (born 20 June 2004) is a Danish professional footballer who plays for Copenhagen.

Club career 
William Clem went through the youth ranks of FC Copenhagen, where he made his first bench appearances with the Superliga team during the 2021–22 Europa Conference while winning the Danish under-19 league. He signed his first professional the following summer.

Having played his first game for Copenhagen on the 19 October 2022, as a starter during the Cup penalty shootout win against Hobro IK, Clem made his Champions League debut less than a week later, starting the away group game to Sevilla. Despite staying in the game until the last minutes, the Danish team eventually conceded a 3–0 away loss, in a side with a record 6 teenagers starting the game.

References

External links

2004 births
Living people
Danish men's footballers
Denmark youth international footballers
Association football midfielders
People from Rudersdal Municipality
F.C. Copenhagen players
Danish Superliga players
Danish people of Norwegian descent